Liuba Dragomir (born 6 May 1985) is a Moldovan former footballer who played as a midfielder. She has been a member of the Moldova women's national team.

International career
Dragomir capped for Moldova at senior level during the 2007 FIFA Women's World Cup qualification (UEFA second category).

References

1985 births
Living people
Women's association football midfielders
Moldovan women's footballers
Moldova women's international footballers